Jeffrey A. Kremers (born 1951) is an American attorney and judge.  He served 26 years as a Wisconsin Circuit Court Judge in Milwaukee County, and was chief judge for the 1st Judicial Administrative District from 2008 until 2015.

Life and career 
Kremers was born to John Kremers and Nelva Jean (Bowers) Nowers.  He graduated from the University of Wisconsin Law School in 1975. He worked in private practice from 1975 to 1976. Between 1976 and 1981, he worked as an assistant district attorney in Milwaukee before returning to private practice.

In 1992, Kremers was appointed to the Wisconsin Circuit Court in Milwaukee County by then-Governor Tommy Thompson, a Republican. He was elected in 1993 and re-elected in 1999, 2005, and 2011.  In 2005, Kremers was appointed as a deputy chief judge of the court. In 2008, the Wisconsin Supreme Court appointed Kremers as the court's chief judge.

In 2013, Kremers was named Judge of the Year by the State Bar of Wisconsin. He was named the State Bar's Lifetime Jurist Achievement Award in 2018.

Kremers retired in July 2018.

References

External links
 Jeffrey Kremers at Ballotpedia

People from Milwaukee County, Wisconsin
Wisconsin lawyers
Wisconsin state court judges
20th-century American judges
21st-century American judges
1951 births
Living people